Mikhail Tarasov (born January 8, 1981) is an Uzbekistani sprint canoer who competed in the mid-2000s. At the 2004 Summer Olympics, he was eliminated in the heats of the K-2 1000 m event.

External links
Sports-Reference.com profile

1981 births
Canoeists at the 2004 Summer Olympics
Living people
Olympic canoeists of Uzbekistan
Uzbekistani male canoeists
Asian Games medalists in canoeing
Canoeists at the 2002 Asian Games
Medalists at the 2002 Asian Games
Asian Games bronze medalists for Uzbekistan
21st-century Uzbekistani people